Stadio Marco Spinelli is a municipal stadium in Alife, Italy. It is the home venue of Eccellenza Molise club Alliphae.

References 

Football venues in Italy